William Falconer may refer to:
William Falconer (poet) (1732–1769), Scottish poet
William Falconer (writer) (1744–1824), English physician, miscellaneous writer, and Fellow of the Royal Society
William Falconer (translator) (1801–1885), English clergymen and academic
William Falconer, 6th Lord Falconer of Halkerton (1712–1776), English aristocrat
William Falconer (bishop) (1707–1784), Scottish clergyman
Willie Falconer (born 1966), Scottish footballer

See also
William Faulkner (disambiguation)
Falconer (surname)